{{DISPLAYTITLE:C10H8N2}}
The molecular formula C10H8N2 (molar mass: 156.18 g/mol, exact mass: 156.0687 u) may refer to:

 Bipyridines
 2,2'-Bipyridine
 4,4'-Bipyridine